Marvila may refer to:

Marvila (Lisbon), a parish of the city of Lisbon, Portugal
Marvila, a village in the municipality of Corbasca, Romania